The Mayor of Mansfield is the directly elected executive mayor of the district of Mansfield in Nottinghamshire, England. A new appointment was created from 2002 following moves made by a Mansfield-based businessman to change the governance of Mansfield after a public referendum.

Andy Abrahams was elected on 3 May 2019 by two votes from sitting incumbent Kate Allsop after two recounts of the second-preference votes.

The incumbent from 2002 to May 2015 was Tony Egginton, succeeded by his fellow Mansfield Independent Forum party member Kate Allsop, who stood against Egginton in 2002 as a Conservative.

From the 2015 booklet issued to all households having registered voters:

Establishment
The role of elected mayor was created following a public referendum on 2 May 2002. The referendum was the culmination of a campaign led by local businessman Stewart Rickersey to have a directly elected mayor for the district. The inaugural election was scheduled for 17 October 2002. Prior to the referendum Mansfield District Council was governed by a leader and cabinet system, in which a leader of the council was elected indirectly from the largest group elected to the council.

Election results

2002

2007

2011
The 2011 election was third direct election for the mayoralty of Mansfield. The sitting mayor, Tony Egginton, successfully defended his position, which he first won in 2002. On 5 May 2011 he was elected for the third time, winning in the second round of voting with the narrow majority of 67 over the Labour candidate Stephen Yemm.

2015
The 2015 election was fourth direct election for the mayoralty of Mansfield. The sitting mayor, Tony Egginton, had previously announced his intention to retire. On 7 May 2015 the candidates were former Labour-member turned Independent Phil Shields, Labour's Martin Lee and Mansfield Independent Forum's Kate Allsop, who after the second round of voting won from Martin Lee with a considerable majority.

2019 
The 2019 election took place on 2 May 2019. The candidates were Incumbent Mayor Kate Allsop from the Mansfield Independent Forum (MIF), Conservative perennial candidate George Jabbour, and District and County Councillor Steve Garner, formerly with MIF, standing as an independent. In late March Mansfield Labour group selected a third candidate in former teacher and civil engineer Andy Abrahams, following the suspension of Cllr Sean McCallum and resignation of Paul Bradshaw. In March 2019, 2015 Mayoral Candidate and former District Councillor Philip Shields announced his intention to run in 2019.

2023 
The 2023 mayoral election is scheduled to take place on 4 May, 2023. Early candidates declared are Andy Abrahams (Labour), Mick Barton (Mansfield Independents), Andre Camilleri (Conservative) and Karen Seymour (Trade Unionist and Socialist Coalition).

The voting system will be first past the post - changing from the supplementary vote used before https://www.electoralcommission.org.uk/who-we-are-and-what-we-do/our-views-and-research/elections-act/changes-voting-system-mayoral-and-pcc-elections

See also
 Mansfield District Council area
 Mansfield (UK Parliament constituency)

References

Mansfield
Mansfield District